The Golden Hawk is a 1952 American historical adventure film directed by Sidney Salkow and starring Rhonda Fleming, Sterling Hayden and John Sutton. It is based on the 1948 novel of the same name by Frank Yerby.

Plot
French sea captain Kit 'The Hawk' Gerardo sails the seas in the 17th century in command of the ship Sea Flower, seeking out Spanish pirate Luis del Toro, believing him responsible for the death of Kit's mother Jeanne Buoyant.

A female pirate who calls herself Captain Rouge disguises herself as a Dutch maid to board a vessel, then shoots and wounds Kit when he attempts to make romantic advances. Kit kidnaps a woman, Bianca, the betrothed of del Toro, and demands 10,000 pieces of gold for her safe return. Del Toro pays, then surrounds Kit with three of his ships to take it back. Rouge wants half the loot for herself. In a raid of Jamaica on orders of the king, Kit discovers that the property once belonged to Rouge, who is a British subject, Lady Jane Golfin, trying to retrieve the riches that have been illegally taken from her family.

Bianca, in love with Kit, betrays him and Kit ends up tried, convicted and sentenced to hang. Del Toro intervenes on his behalf, however, and reveals that Kit is his own son.

Cast
 Sterling Hayden as Kit 'The Hawk' Gerardo
 Rhonda Fleming as Captain Rouge
 Helena Carter as Blanca de Valdiva
 John Sutton as Captain Luis del Toro
 Paul Cavanagh as Jeremy Smithers
 Michael Ansara as Bernardo Díaz
 Raymond Hatton as Barnaby Stoll
 Alex Montoya as Homado
 Poppy del Vando as Doña Elena 
 Albert Pollet as Governor Ducasse
 David Bond as	Prosecutor
 Donna Martell as 	Emilie Savonez
 Mary Munday as Maria
 Franklyn Farnum as Spanish Tribunal Judge
 Tommy Farrell as 	Spanish Captain
 Stanley Blystone as Pirate Lookout 
 Suzanne Ridgway as Native Girl 
 Amapola Del Vando as 	Senora del Toro

Production
Frank Yerby's novel was published in 1948. The book was a best seller, selling 1,863,000 copies. In 1951 it was announced Sterling Hayden and Rhonda Fleming would star in a film version. Helena Carter played the second female lead.

See also
 Sterling Hayden filmography

References

External links
 
 
 Review of film at Variety

1952 films
1950s historical adventure films
1950s English-language films
American historical adventure films
Columbia Pictures films
Films directed by Sidney Salkow
Films set in the 17th century
Films based on American novels
Pirate films
1950s American films